The concept of home improvement, home renovation, or remodeling is the process of renovating or making additions to one's home. Home improvement can consist of projects that upgrade an existing home interior (such as electrical and plumbing), exterior (masonry, concrete, siding, roofing) or other improvements to the property (i.e. garden work or garage maintenance/additions). Home improvement projects can be carried out for a number of different reasons; personal preference and comfort, maintenance or repair work, making a home bigger by adding rooms/spaces, as a means of saving energy, or to improve safety.

Types of home improvement
While "home improvement" often refers to building projects that alter the structure of an existing home, it can also include improvements to lawns, gardens, and outdoor structures, such as gazebos and garages. It also encompasses maintenance, repair, and general servicing tasks. Home improvement projects generally have one or more of the following goals:

Comfort
Upgrading heating, ventilation and air conditioning systems (HVAC).
Upgrading rooms with luxuries, such as adding gourmet features to a kitchen or a hot tub spa to a bathroom.
Increasing the capacity of plumbing and electrical systems.
Waterproofing basements.
Soundproofing rooms, especially bedrooms and baths.

Maintenance and repair
Maintenance projects can include:
Roof tear-off and replacement.
Replacement or new construction windows.
Concrete and masonry repairs to the foundation and chimney.
Repainting rooms, walls or fences
Repairing plumbing and electrical systems
Wall papers 
Furniture polish
High-end expertise in quality home interior and exterior works
Shower maintenance

Additional space
Additional living space may be added by:
Turning marginal areas into livable spaces such as turning basements into recrooms, home theaters, or home offices – or attics into spare bedrooms.
Extending one's house with rooms added to the side of one's home or, sometimes, extra levels to the original roof. Such a new unit of construction is called an "add-on".

Saving energy
Homeowners may reduce utility costs with:
Energy-efficient thermal insulation, replacement windows, and lighting.
Renewable energy with biomass pellet stoves, wood-burning stoves, solar panels, wind turbines, programmable thermostats, and geothermal exchange heat pumps (see autonomous building).

Safety and preparedness
Emergency preparedness safety measures such as:
Home fire and burglar alarm systems.
Fire sprinkler systems to protect homes from fires.
Security doors, windows, and shutters.
Storm cellars as protection from tornadoes and hurricanes.
Bomb shelters especially during the 1950s as protection from nuclear war.
Backup generators for providing power during power outages.

Home improvement industry

Home or residential renovation is an almost $300 billion industry in the United States, and a $48 billion industry in Canada. The average cost per project is $3,000 in the United States and $11,000–15,000 in Canada.

Professional home improvement is ancient and goes back to the beginning of recorded civilization. One example is Sergius Orata, who in the 1st century B.C. is said by the writer Vitruvius (in his famous book De architectura) to have invented the hypocaust. The hypocaust is an underfloor heating system that was used throughout the Roman Empire in villas of the wealthy. He is said to have become wealthy himself by buying villas at a low price, adding spas and his newly invented hypocaust, and reselling them at higher prices.

Renovation contractors
Perhaps the most important or visible professionals in the renovation industry are renovation contractors or skilled trades. These are the builders that have specialized credentials, licensing and experience to perform renovation services in specific municipalities.

While there is a fairly large ‘grey market’ of unlicensed companies, there are those that have membership in a reputable association and/or are accredited by a professional organization. Homeowners are recommended to perform checks such as verifying license and insurance and checking business references prior to hiring a contractor to work on their house.

Because interior renovation will touch the change of the internal structure of the house, ceiling construction, circuit configuration and partition walls, etc., such work related to the structure of the house, of course, also includes renovation of wallpaper posting, furniture settings, lighting, etc. It is worth noting The thing is, the decoration construction team must be approved by the established interior design company to guarantee.

Aggregators
Aggregators are companies that bundle home improvement service offers and act as intermediary agency between service providers and customers.

In popular culture
Home improvement was popularized on television in 1979 with the premiere of This Old House starring Bob Vila on PBS. American cable channel HGTV features many do-it-yourself shows, as does sister channel DIY Network.
Danny Lipford hosts and produces the nationally syndicated Today's Homeowner with Danny Lipford. Tom Kraeutler and Leslie Segrete co-host the nationally syndicated The Money Pit Home Improvement Radio Show.

Movies that poked fun at the difficulties involved include: Mr. Blandings Builds His Dream House (1948), starring Cary Grant and Myrna Loy; George Washington Slept Here (1942), featuring Jack Benny and Ann Sheridan; and The Money Pit (1986), with Tom Hanks and Shelley Long. The sitcom Home Improvement used the home improvement theme for comedic purposes.

See also

Home repair
Housekeeping
Maintenance, repair and operations

References

Further reading
 Richard Harris, Building a Market: The Rise of the Home Improvement Industry, 1914-1960. Chicago: University of Chicago Press, 2012.
 

 
Building